Ilona Senderek-Wójcik (born 15 December 1988) is a Polish former competitive figure skater. She is the 2004 Polish national champion and competed in the final segment at the 2005 World Junior Championships.

Personal life
Senderek-Wójcik was born on 15 December 1988 in Warsaw, Poland. She graduated from the Warsaw University of Technology with a degree in biotechnology.

Career
Senderek started her sports career as a roller skater and competed in a couple of competitions at the national level. She soon became interested in figure ice-skating and started regular training in that sport in 1998. She qualified to the final segment at the 2005 World Junior Championships in Kitchener, Ontario, Canada; she ranked 10th in her qualifying group, 20th in the short program, 23rd in the free skate, and 24th overall.

Senderek-Wójcik is an International Technical Specialist. She coaches figure skating in Warsaw. She is the coach of Polish national silver medalist Oliwia Rzepiel.

Programs

Competitive highlights
JGP: ISU Junior Grand Prix

References

External links
 
 

1988 births
Living people
Polish female single skaters
Polish figure skating coaches
Figure skaters from Warsaw